The Semliki red colobus (Piliocolobus semlikiensis) is a type of red colobus monkey from central Africa.  Historically it has been treated as a subspecies of the Central African red colobus (P. foai) but more recent taxonomies generally treat it as a separate species.

The Semliki red colobus lives in ironwood forest in the portion of the northeastern Democratic Republic of the Congo between the Semliki River valley and the Ruwenzori Mountains.  It may also live in a small area of Uganda.

References

Piliocolobus
Primates of Africa
Mammals described in 1991
Mammals of the Democratic Republic of the Congo
Endemic fauna of the Democratic Republic of the Congo